Michael J. Storer (born 28 February 1997) is an Australian cyclist, who currently rides for UCI WorldTeam .

Career
In August 2018, he was named in the startlist for the Vuelta a España. He also competed in the 2019 Vuelta a España, and the 2020 Vuelta a España.

He rode the Giro for the first time in his career in 2021. He finished 31st while riding in support of Romain Bardet, who finished in 7th overall.

During the 2021 Vuelta a España Storer won the first grand tour stage of his career on stage 7 and then went on to win again on stage 10. With this he became just the 2nd Australian, after Michael Matthews, to win multiple stages in the Vuelta. On stage 7 and then again on stage 18, when he went on a solo attack of about 70km before being caught on the final climb, he was awarded the combativity prize for the stage. With his attack on stage 18 he also took over the lead in the King of the Mountains competition and held onto the jersey thereafter winning the competition outright.

Storer will move to French UCI WorldTeam  in January 2022.

Major results

2014
 Oceanian Junior Road Championships
1st  Time trial
5th Road race
 3rd  Time trial, UCI Junior Road World Championships
 3rd Trofeo Buffoni
2015
 Oceanian Junior Road Championships
1st  Time trial
5th Road race
 1st  Road race, National Junior Road Championships
 4th Overall Aubel–Thimister–La Gleize
1st Stage 3
2016
 Oceanian Road Championships
1st  Under-23 road race
3rd  Under-23 time trial
4th Road race
 1st Gran Premio di Poggiana
 5th Road race, National Under-23 Road Championships
 5th Chrono Champenois
 7th Overall Tour de l'Avenir
2017
 1st Gran Premio Industrie del Marmo
 1st Stage 1a (TTT) Toscana-Terra di Ciclismo
 1st Stage 4 An Post Rás
 Oceanian Under-23 Road Championships
2nd Road race
4th Time trial
 2nd Gran Premio di Poggiana
 3rd Time trial, National Under-23 Road Championships
 3rd Overall Giro della Valle d'Aosta
 4th Gran Premio Palio del Recioto
 5th Overall Herald Sun Tour
 8th Giro del Belvedere
 9th Overall Tour de l'Avenir
2018
 5th Overall Tour de Yorkshire
 5th Overall Tour of Slovenia
 9th Overall Hammer Sportzone Limburg 
2019
 2nd Overall Hammer Stavanger 
 4th Overall Hammer Limburg 
2020
 7th Overall Herald Sun Tour
2021
 1st  Overall Tour de l'Ain
1st  Points classification
1st  Mountains classification
1st Stage 3
 Vuelta a España
1st  Mountains classification
1st Stages 7 & 10
 Combativity award Stages 7 & 18
2022
 2nd Overall Tour of the Alps
 3rd Mont Ventoux Dénivelé Challenge
 10th Giro dell'Emilia

Grand Tour general classification results timeline

References

External links

1997 births
Living people
Australian male cyclists
Australian Vuelta a España stage winners
Cyclists from Sydney